Stanley Moore (18 April 1886 – 22 March 1948) was an Australian cricketer. He played eight first-class matches for New South Wales and Queensland between 1912/13 and 1920/21.

See also
 List of New South Wales representative cricketers

References

External links
 

1886 births
1948 deaths
Australian cricketers
New South Wales cricketers
Queensland cricketers
Cricketers from Sydney